Usa Tenpaksee (born 17 September 1984) is a Thai beach volleyball player. She competed at the 2012 Asian Beach Games in Haiyang, China.

References

External links
 
 

1984 births
Living people
Usa Tenpaksee
Usa Tenpaksee
Asian Games medalists in beach volleyball
Usa Tenpaksee
Medalists at the 2010 Asian Games
Beach volleyball players at the 2006 Asian Games
Beach volleyball players at the 2010 Asian Games
Beach volleyball players at the 2014 Asian Games
Usa Tenpaksee
Usa Tenpaksee
Southeast Asian Games medalists in volleyball
Competitors at the 2005 Southeast Asian Games
Competitors at the 2007 Southeast Asian Games
Competitors at the 2009 Southeast Asian Games
Competitors at the 2011 Southeast Asian Games
Usa Tenpaksee
Usa Tenpaksee